Nehalem Bay State Park is a state park in the United States located on the Oregon Coast, near the communities of Nehalem and Manzanita on the Nehalem Spit, a sand spit west of Nehalem Bay.

Tillamook County transferred the land to the State of Oregon for a park in the 1930s. During the 1940s and 1950s, workers planted European beach grass, shore pine, and Scotch broom to stabilize the dunes—a process that took an additional twenty years. The park opened in 1972.

This park has a day-use areas, and a campground for tents, recreational vehicles, horse riders, hikers and bicyclists.

Its wildlife includes a variety of birds, deer, elk, mountain lions, black bears and coyotes.

There is an air strip for small planes, the Nehalem Bay State Airport, and an amphitheater that has interpretative programs throughout the summer months.

The park is south of nearby Neahkahnie Mountain the highest coastal land mass north of San Francisco and south of Canada.  The trail to the summit of the mountain was constructed by the Civilian Conservation Corps (CCC). in the 1930s. Nehalem Beach is within the park.

See also

Nehalem Bank
Cronin Point Site

References

External links
 

Oregon Coast
State parks of Oregon
Parks in Tillamook County, Oregon